You may also be looking for the 1521 Siege of Allenstein.

The Battle of Allenstein (or Olsztyn), also known as the Battle of Jonkowo (or Jankowo, Inkowo, Jonkendorf) was a military engagement during the early stages of the 1807 Fourth Coalition Napoleonic campaign. While the battle resulted in a French field victory and allowed for a successful pursuit of the Russian army, it failed to produce the decisive engagement that Napoleon was seeking.

Context

After crushing the Prussian forces in 1806, Napoleon and his Grande Armée advanced east into the eastern provinces of Prussia, with the aim of bringing the Russian there army to give decisive battle. However, the arrival of winter led the Emperor to order his army to winter quarters, thinking that the Russians will do the same. In order to exploit this misapprehension, the Russian commander Levin August von Bennigsen decided to take the initiative and, towards the end of January set his troops in motion to attack the weak French left, crush it and fall behind the French army.

Quite fortuitously, the French of Michel Ney's Corps, who had disobeyed orders and overextended his foraging array, encountered the Russian advance guard. Thus Napoleon was able to read into Bennigsen's intentions and set up what was supposed to be the decisive manoeuvre of the campaign. Ordering his left wing to fall back in order to pull in the Russian army westwards, the Emperor directed the bulk of his forces northwards, towards Allenstein, in a bid to outflank the unsuspecting enemy and fall behind it with superior forces.

As chance would have it, the Russians intercepted a crucial dispatch, in which the Chief of Staff, Louis Alexandre Berthier, was explaining the entire plan to the commander of the left wing corps, Jean-Baptiste Bernadotte. This allowed Bennigsen to realize the mortal danger in which his army lay and begin a precipitated retreat northeast.

Battle
Meanwhile, oblivious of the Russian retreat, the French pursued their intended manoeuvre, pushing their advance guard, elements of the Reserve Cavalry Corps of Joachim Murat, supported by Jean-de-Dieu Soult's Corps, towards the Alle river.

On February 3, these troops arrived at Allenstein and the Inkowo plateau, where they discovered a portion of the retreating Russian army. Seeing an opportunity for a major battle, Napoleon ordered four more army corps to march to the battlefield. He detailed Murat to delay his attack in order to wait for reinforcements and, as soon as these reached the battlefield, attack the Russians frontally using Louis-Vincent-Joseph Le Blond de Saint-Hilaire's division, while Soult would march to flank the enemy.

On the Russian side, General Nikolay Kamensky was forced to accept battle rather than retreat, in order to protect the strategic Liebstadt road and the bridges over the Alle in Bergfriede, which were key for the successful retreat of the rest of the army. He was helped in his task by the fact the French only attacked towards 15:00 hours, a delay caused by Napoleon's orders to Murat. When the French eventually attacked, the Russians were prepared and used their fifteen cannon and musketry to inflict heavy losses to the advancing enemy. Nevertheless, the Russian tactical disposition, defending a defilé rather than occupying high ground, soon forced them to give ground under the pressure.

Towards the end of the afternoon, Soult, with the 24th Light and 4th Line regiments began his flanking attack and, after some ferocious combat, pushed the Russians beyond the Alle, capturing an intact Bergfriede bridge. With night falling and his position completely compromised, Bennigsen decided to hasten his retreat and ordered Kamensky to extricate his force and withdraw to Deppen. Both sides suffered relatively high losses, with the Russians forced to abandon six cannon and three hundred prisoners on the field of battle.

Result
Despite this tactical success, Napoleon failed to bring the Russians to give decisive battle, requiring a further exhausting wintertime pursuit. Nevertheless, the French did capture the intact strategic bridges over the Alle, which the Russians omitted to blow up.

French pursuit resumed the next day, resulting in the capture of sixteen cannon, while the day after Soult captured no less than 1200 prisoners. A series of skirmishes led to the Battle of Hoff on February 6, followed by the Battle of Eylau, one of the bloodiest engagements of the entire Napoleonic Wars.

Gallery

Notes

References

External links

1807 in France
1807 in Germany
1807 in Prussia
Conflicts in 1807
Battles of the Napoleonic Wars
Battles of the War of the Fourth Coalition
Battles involving Russia
Battles involving France
History of Warmian-Masurian Voivodeship
Olsztyn
February 1807 events
Joachim Murat